This is a list of the operating Victorian regional railway stations serviced by V/Line operated trains. The stations are located on 13 passenger train lines, which all operate from Southern Cross station in Melbourne, Australia.

Stations listed in bold are terminus stations. Frequent services operate to the major regional cities of Ballarat, Bendigo, Geelong, Seymour, and the Latrobe Valley; with a smaller number of services continuing to the end of their respective lines.

North
Frequent services operate to Bendigo, with some trains continuing to either Echuca or Swan Hill.

Bendigo line

The line continues on from the Sunbury suburban line at Sunbury.

Sunbury (suburban station)
Clarkefield
Riddells Creek
Gisborne
Macedon
Woodend
Kyneton
Malmsbury
Castlemaine
Kangaroo Flat
Bendigo

In addition to this, most Bendigo line services continue north of Bendigo to various stations serving suburbs and towns surrounding Bendigo, as part of the Bendigo Metro project.

 Services from Bendigo continuing north
Branch 1
Eaglehawk
Raywood 
Branch 2
Epsom
Huntly 
Goornong

Echuca line
The line continues from the Bendigo line at Goornong.
Elmore
Rochester
Echuca

Swan Hill line
The line continues from the Bendigo line at Raywood.
Dingee
Pyramid
Kerang
Swan Hill

North east
Frequent services operate to Seymour, with some trains continuing to Shepparton. The Albury line is no longer connected to the other 2.

Seymour line
The line continues on from the Craigieburn suburban line at Craigieburn.

Craigieburn (suburban station)
Donnybrook
Wallan
Heathcote Junction
Wandong
Kilmore East
Broadford
Tallarook
Seymour

Albury line

The Albury-Wodonga line was formerly the only broad gauge line operated by V/Line to cross the border into New South Wales, with the primary terminus being located in the New South Wales town of Albury. In 2008 the broad gauge line closed for conversion, with this completed in 2011. This means the line can no longer be considered an extension of some Seymour line services.

Southern Cross
Broadmeadows
Seymour
Avenel
Euroa
Violet Town
Benalla
Wangaratta
Springhurst
Chiltern
Wodonga
Albury

NSW regional rail operator NSW TrainLink operate the inter-capital XPT service between Melbourne and Sydney, which stops at Broadmeadows, Seymour, Benalla, Wangaratta and Albury.

Shepparton line
The line branches from the North East line at Seymour.
Seymour
Nagambie
Murchison East
Mooroopna
Shepparton

East
Frequent services operate to Traralgon, with some trains continuing to Bairnsdale.

Traralgon line
The line continues on from the Pakenham suburban line at Pakenham.

Richmond (suburban station)
Caulfield (suburban station)
Clayton (suburban station)
Dandenong (suburban station)
Pakenham (suburban station)
Nar Nar Goon
Tynong
Garfield
Bunyip
Longwarry
Drouin
Warragul
Yarragon
Trafalgar
Moe
Morwell
Traralgon

Bairnsdale line
The line continues from the Traralgon line at Traralgon.

Rosedale
Sale
Stratford
Bairnsdale

West
Frequent services operate to Ballarat, with some trains continuing to Ararat. Some services also run to Maryborough as shuttle services from Ballarat.

Ballarat line
The line branches from the Sunbury suburban line at Sunshine.

Sunshine (suburban station)
Ardeer
Deer Park
Caroline Springs
Rockbank
Cobblebank
Melton
Bacchus Marsh
Ballan
Ballarat
Wendouree

Ararat line
The Ballarat - Ararat section of the line was closed from 1994 until 10 July 2004, when it was reopened for a twice-daily service as part of the Linking Victoria Project. Services now run 5 times per day.

Continues from the Ballarat line service.
Wendouree
Beaufort
Ararat

Maryborough line
The Mildura railway line was closed by the Kennett Government in 1993 after the withdrawal of The Vinelander service.

As part of the Victorian Transport Plan, passenger services resumed on the Mildura line to Maryborough on 25 July 2010. Services operate 2 times per day, as shuttles from Ballarat.

Connects to a train from Melbourne
Ballarat
Creswick
Clunes
Talbot
Maryborough

South west

Frequent services operate to Geelong, with some trains continuing to Warrnambool.

Geelong line
The line runs on the dedicated Regional Rail Link tracks from Southern Cross station
Footscray (suburban station)
Sunshine (suburban station)
Ardeer
Deer Park
Tarneit
Wyndham Vale
Little River
Lara
Corio
North Shore (Interchange with Overland services to Adelaide)
North Geelong
Geelong
South Geelong (terminus for every other train in weekday off peak)
Marshall
Waurn Ponds

Warrnambool line
From mid-1993 to 31 August 2004, the Warrnambool service was operated by the now-defunct West Coast Railway.

Continues from the Geelong line service

Winchelsea
Birregurra
Colac
Camperdown
Terang
Sherwood Park
Warrnambool

These trains also connect with coach services to Port Fairy, Portland and Mount Gambier.

Non-V/Line stations
The Overland service to Adelaide calls at several otherwise-disused stations in western Victoria. These are:

Stawell
Horsham 
Dimboola
Nhill

There are only two trains per week, operated by Journey Beyond. Seats are reserved for V/Line passengers for the stations listed above, in addition to Ararat. There are frequent proposals to restore regular V/Line service to Horsham or Dimboola, which would also stop at other stations.

Passenger lines proposed for reopening

Several lines were promised for reopening in the early 2000s as part of the Linking Victoria program, however 2 projects were not completed.

The most commonly proposed services are:

Mildura line 

Originally withdrawn on 12 September 1993. Once served by The Vinelander service, the line branches from the Serviceton line at Ballarat. V/Line passenger trains currently operate to Maryborough.
Ballarat
Creswick
Clunes
Maryborough
Dunolly
St Arnaud
Donald
Birchip
Ouyen
Red Cliffs
Irymple
Mildura

Horsham line

Originally withdrawn on 21 August 1993 to Dimboola; however, Journey Beyond's Melbourne to Adelaide Overland trains operate twice a week. The current Broad Gauge V/Line passenger rail services terminates at Ararat.

Ararat
Stawell
Murtoa
Horsham
Dimboola

Leongatha line 

Originally withdrawn on 24 July 1993; however, the Dandenong to Cranbourne section was retained and became part of the Melbourne Suburban rail network in 1995.

Tooradin
Koo Wee Rup
Lang Lang
Nyora
Loch
Korumburra
Leongatha

See also
List of closed railway stations in Victoria
List of Melbourne railway stations
List of localities (Victoria)

References

Regional railway stations in Victoria
 
Regional railway stations
Vic
Railway stations, regional